The following are the standings of the 2008–09 Iran 2nd Division football season.

First round

Group A

Group B

Group C

Group D

Second round

Group A

On August 30, 2009 Iranjavan bought Moghavemat Mersad Football Club for a reported price of around $480,000 so Iranjavan Promoted Azadegan League

Group B

Relegation play-off

Shandiner Bari Urmia relegated to 3rd Division

April 10, Ghods Stadium, Tehran

Shahrdari Kerman relegated to 3rd Division

References

League 2 (Iran) seasons
3